Dabusun or  alternately known as  is a lake beside the town Qarhan, just north of Golmud in the Haixi Prefecture of Qinghai Province in northwestern China. Fed by the main course of the Golmud River, it is the largest present-day lake in the Qarhan Playa. Like the other lakes of the surrounding Qaidam Basin, it is extremely saline, with 307–338 grams of salt per liter of water

Name
Dabusun or Dabasun Nor is a romanization of its Mongolian name, which means simply "Salt Lake". In Mongolian, the name is sometimes designated "eastern", to distinguish it from West Dabusun Lake. It is sometimes misspelled Dabsun or Dabsan. It was formerly known as the Dalai Dabasun, meaning "Sea" or "Ocean of Salt".

Dabuxun is the pinyin romanization of the Chinese name  (Dábùxùn), a transcription into characters of the Mongolian name.

Geography
Dabusun lies in the Dabusun subbasin in the central Qarhan Playa. It is one of the many saltwater lakes in the endorheic Qaidam Basin, bound by the Qilian Mountains to the north, the Altun to the west, and the Kunlun to the south. Dabasun is the largest present lake in the Qarhan Playa. It is fed by the main course of the Golmud River from the south and, to a lesser extent, by mineral springs from the north. Its area is thus variable by season and year, usually  but increasing in the wetter winter and spring and decreasing through the summer and fall. The lake is elongated, stretching from the northwest to the southeast.

Geology
Although the northern springs contribute much less volume, their waters carry far greater concentrations of solutes and are important to the chemical composition of the lake. Below, the alternating beds of mud and halite extend at least  in some places.

History

Paleoclimatologists believe that between 770,000 and 30,000 years ago Dabusun formed part of a much larger Qarhan Lake, which alternated nine times between being a fresh- and saltwater lake. Tectonic activity also varied sedimentation in the lake by shifting its tributaries and basins, although it remained in the Qarhan Playa during this period. It was cut off and became saline again around 30,000 years ago and began precipitating salts about 25,000 years ago.

Until the recent commercial exploitation of the salts and other minerals, the district has remained largely unpopulated, as the salt deposits made it difficult for the nomads of northwestern China to use the area for their herds. The area's potassium deposits were accidentally discovered in 1957 and exploratory wells found the Yanhu Gas Field north of the lake the next year.

Transportation

The lake lies just west of the G3011 Liuge Expressway. It is also serviced by the Dabusun and Qarhan railway stations on the Qingzang Railway.

See also
 Salt in Chinese history
 List of lakes and saltwater lakes of China

Notes

References

Citations

Bibliography

 .
 .
 .
 .
 .
 .
 .
 .
 .
 .
 .
 .
 .
 .
 .
 .
 .
 .

Lakes of China
Lakes of Qinghai
Haixi Mongol and Tibetan Autonomous Prefecture